Jury instructions, directions to the jury, or judge's charge are legal rules that jurors should follow when deciding a case. They are a type of jury control procedure to support a fair trial.

Description 
Jury instructions are the set of legal rules governing how jurors should behave when deciding a case, often addressing with whom jurors may discuss the case and how jurors will decide who is guilty. They are a type of jury control procedure, intended to mitigate potential actions of jurors that may prevent a fair trial; the judge provides these instructions to ensure their interests are represented and nothing prejudicial is said.

Use

United States
Under the American judicial system, juries are often the trier of fact when they serve in a trial. In other words, it is their job to sort through disputed accounts presented in evidence. The judge decides questions of law, meaning he or she decides how the law applies to a given set of facts. Jury instructions are given to the jury by the judge, who usually reads them aloud to the jury. The judge issues a judge's charge to inform the jury how to act in deciding a case. The jury instructions provide something of a flow chart on what verdict jurors should deliver based on what they determine to be true. Put another way, "If you believe A (set of facts), you must find X (verdict).  If you believe B (set of facts), you must find Y (verdict)."  Jury instructions can also serve an important role in guiding the jury how to consider certain evidence.

All 50 states have a model set of instructions, usually called "pattern jury instructions", which provide the framework for the charge to the jury; sometimes, only names and circumstances have to be filled in for a particular case. Often they are much more complex, although certain elements frequently recur. For instance, if a criminal defendant chooses not to testify, the jury will often be instructed not to draw any negative conclusions from that decision.  Many jurisdictions are now instructing jurors not to communicate about the case through social networking services like Facebook and Twitter.

Comprehending jury instructions 

A significant issue with standard jury instructions is the language comprehension difficulties for the average juror. The purpose of jury instructions is to inform jurors of relevant laws and their application in the process of coming to a verdict. However, studies have shown that juries consistently run into problems understanding the instructions given to them. Poor comprehension is noted across juror demographics, as well as across legal contexts. Various linguistic features of legalese or legal English, such as complex sentence structures and technical jargon, have been pinpointed as major factors contributing to low comprehension.

Simplifying jury instructions through the use of plain English has been shown to markedly increase juror comprehension. In one study of California’s jury instructions in cases involving the death penalty, approximately 200 university students participated in a research experiment. Half of the participants heard the original standard instructions written in legal English, and half heard revised instructions in plain English. Instructions were read twice to each group, and the participants then answered questions for researchers to gauge their understanding. The results showed a notable disparity in comprehension between the two groups. The group that received revised instructions demonstrated stronger understanding of relevant points such as key concepts, and the ability to differentiate between legal terms.

In another California study, jury instructions were again simplified to make them easier for jurors to understand. The courts moved cautiously because, although verdicts are rarely overturned due to jury instructions in civil court, this is not the case in criminal court. For example, the old instructions on burden of proof in civil cases read:

The new instructions read:
Resistance to the movement towards the revision of standard jury instructions exists as well. This is due to the concern that moving away from legal English will result in jury instructions becoming imprecise. There is also the belief that jurors prefer judges to speak in legal language so that they come across as educated and respectable.

Jury nullification instructions
There is also debate over whether juries that are to judge a criminal case should be informed of the possibility of jury nullification during jury instructions. One argument states that if juries have the power of jury nullification, then they should be informed of it and that neglecting to do so is an act of intervention. Another argument states that defendants should be judged according to the law, and that jury nullification interferes with this process. It is also debated that instructions permitting jury nullification is to be criticized as promoting chaos, as it brings the decision between having a structured set of rules and having less of said rules for a more free set of choices that could also promote the likes of anarchy and tyranny.

Studies have indicated that being informed of jury nullification is likely to affect the judgement of juries when they decide on verdicts. One study that looked into 144 juries showed that they were less harsh on sympathetic defendants and harsher on unsympathetic defendants when they had been briefed on jury nullification. Another study that looked into 45 juries showed that they were likelier to reach a guilty verdict in drunk driving cases and less likely in euthanasia cases, with no reported difference in likelihood in murder cases, with the inclusion of explicit jury nullification details in jury instructions.

United Kingdom 
The judge presents directions to the jury court, after overlapping instructions have been provided by a DVD and a jury manager.

References

External links
 Federal Jury Instruction Resource Page Collecting model or pattern federal civil and criminal jury instructions for trial courts by jurisdiction (where available) and subject matter.
 Jury Instructions in Insurance-Coverage and Insurance Bad-Faith Cases
 Sample Eighth Circuit Civil Jury Instructions
 Criminal Pattern Jury Instructions, 10th Circuit U.S. Court of Appeals.

Juries